Castle Peak is a hill in western Texas  south of Merkel in southwest Taylor County.

References

Mountains of Texas
Landforms of Taylor County, Texas